Iliass Aouani (born 29 September 1995) is an Italian middle and long-distance runner.

Achievements

National titles
Aouani won five national championships at individual senior level.

Italian Athletics Championships
10,000 m: 2021
Half marathon: 2021
Italian Cross Country Championships
Long course: 2021, 2022
Italian 10 km road Championship
10 km road: 2021

References

External links
 

1995 births
Living people
Italian male middle-distance runners
Italian male long-distance runners
Syracuse Orange men's track and field athletes